Shahapur is a Census town in the Bhandara tahsil of Bhandara District of Maharashtra state in India. It is situated on the back of NH-6. the town speaks Marathi language. Famous online (kabadiwala) scrap dealer known as Ekabadiwala are based in Shahapur, Bhandara.

Nanaji Joshi Vidyalaya is a very popular and best-performing school at Shahapur in Bhandara district and also Manoharbhai Patel Institute of Engineering and Technology also known as (MIET, Bhandara) engineering college is located in Bhandara districts of Maharashtra, India.
 Cities and towns in Bhandara district